The 
are a series of annual film awards, sponsored by Mainichi Shinbun (毎日新聞), one of the largest newspaper companies in Japan, since 1946. It is the first film festival in Japan.

History 
The origins of the contest date back to 1935, when the Mainichi Shinbun organized a festival then called Zen Nihon eiga konkūru (全日本映画コンク ー ル? ). It was interrupted during World War 2. The current form of the Mainichi Film Awards officially came into being in 1946.

Awards
 Mainichi Film Award for Best Film
 Mainichi Film Award for Excellence Film
 Mainichi Film Award for Best Director
 Mainichi Film Award for Best Cinematography
 Mainichi Film Award for Best Art Direction
 Mainichi Film Award for Best Animation Film
 Mainichi Film Award for Best Actor
 Mainichi Film Award for Best Supporting Actor
 Mainichi Film Award for Best Actress
 Mainichi Film Award for Best Supporting Actress
 Mainichi Film Award for Best Film Score
 Mainichi Film Award for Foreign Film Best One Award
 Mainichi Film Award for Best Screenplay
 Mainichi Film Award for Best Music
 Mainichi Film Award for Best Sound Recording
 Ōfuji Noburō Award
 Kinuyo Tanaka Award

References

External links 
 
IMDb: Mainichi Film Concours
Table of awards
Pellas page on Ōfuji Noburō Award
Ōfuji past winners showing at the Laputa anime festival in 2000

Awards established in 1946
Film festivals in Japan
Recurring events established in 1946
Japanese film awards
1946 establishments in Japan
Annual events in Japan